Goldscheider Porcelain Manufactory and Majolica Factory (later: Goldscheider Keramik) was an Austrian ceramic manufactory.

History
In 1885, Friedrich Goldscheider came from the Bohemian city of Plzeň to Vienna and founded the Goldscheider Porcelain Manufactory and Majolica Factory. It became one of the most influential ceramic manufactories of terracotta, faience and bronze objects in Austria, with subsidiaries in Paris, Leipzig and Florence. For over half a century, Goldscheider created masterpieces of historical revivalism, Art Nouveau (Jugendstil) and Art Deco.

Famous artists such as Josef Lorenzl, Stefan Dakon, Ida Meisinger and the two perhaps best known Austrian ceramic artists (Michael Powolny and Vally Wieselthier) worked for Goldscheider. Several of the artists who worked for Goldscheider also worked for other Viennese studios, such as Augarten, Keramos or for the German brands Rosenthal and Meissen.

The Goldscheider family migrated in 1938 to the United Kingdom and the USA. Walter Goldscheider started a new factory in Trenton, New Jersey, and he returned to Vienna in 1950. Marcel Goldscheider went to Stoke-on-Trent and produced figurative ceramics for Myott, and he opened his own studio in the 1950s in Hanley. Both brothers died in the early 1960s.

More than 10,000 different models were created over a period of three generations. Since the very beginning, many of these won first prizes and gold medals at innumerable world fairs, exhibitions and trade fairs. Goldscheider figures are nowadays very much sought after by collectors worldwide and reach astonishing prices at auctions such as Sotheby's, Christie's, Dorotheum and on eBay.

The son of Friedrich Goldscheider,  was an art publisher in Paris during the Art Deco-era.

Recent exhibitions
Several exhibitions and lectures took place since the new book on Goldscheider was presented in 2007 to the public: a big Goldscheider exhibition was shown at the Vienna Museum (November 2007 – February 2008), at the LBI in New York (January–April 2009), as well as lectures in Prague at the Museum of Decorative Arts (June 2008) and at the 10th Worldwide Art Deco Congress in Montreal (May 2009). 

From June to October 2015, the Grassi Museum in Leipzig honoured the history of Goldscheider with an exhibition. Current exhibitions are usually shown at the official Goldscheider website.

Bibliography
 Gerald Koenecke, Goldscheider – West Germany. Figuren und Wandmasken 1953-60. Göttingen, 2000 Edition Ruprecht, 
 Robert E. Dechant and Filipp Goldscheider, "GOLDSCHEIDER. History of the Company and Catalogue of Works". (Firmengeschichte und Werkverzeichnis), 640 pages, 23 x 31 cm, over 2,300 illustrations, 500 in colour, approx. 1,600 models and 163 signatures reproduced. Hardcover with dust jacket. Text in English and German. Stuttgart, 2008 Arnoldsche 
 Exotik/Verführung/Glamour. Die Weltmarke Goldscheider. Grassi Museum für Angewandte Kunst, Leipzig 2015, 63 pages, mainly illustrated

External links
Official Goldscheider site in ENGLISH
Official Goldscheider site in GERMAN
Book on Goldscheider ceramics by Arnoldsche Art Publishers; Robert E. Dechant and Filipp Goldscheider
Goldscheider exhibition at the Grassi Museum in 2015

Austrian brands
Ceramics manufacturers of Austria
Manufacturing companies based in Vienna
Art Nouveau
Art Deco
Design companies established in 1885
Manufacturing companies established in 1885
19th century in Vienna
1885 establishments in Austria